The 1977 Soviet Cup was an association football cup competition of the Soviet Union. The winner of the competition, Dinamo Moscow qualified for the continental tournament.

Competition schedule

First round
 [Mar 27] 
 GURIA Lanchkhuti            4-1  Shinnik Yaroslavl 
   [B.Mchedlishvili 8, 10, 35 pen, V.Troyan 80 - Nikolai Vikharev 82. Att: 6,000] 
 Krivbass Krivoi Rog         1-2  SKA Khabarovsk 
   [Oleg Chumak – Lev Kutashov, Anatoliy Olkhovik. Att: 20,000] 
 Kuzbass Kemerovo            0-1  ISKRA Smolensk         [in Andizhan] 
   [Jemal Silagadze. Att: 6,000] 
 Mashuk Pyatigorsk           1-2  PAMIR Dushanbe         [aet] 
   [Alexandr Sabinin - Mansur Karimov, Valeriy Tursunov. Att: 4,000] 
 METALLURG Zaporozhye        2-1  Dinamo Brest 
   [Vitaliy Denezh 59, Alexandr Polishchuk 84 pen – Alexandr Razumovich 62. Att: 20,000] 
 NISTRU Kishinev             2-0  Dinamo Leningrad       [aet] 
   [Viktor Tomashevskiy, Igor Nadein. Att: 15,000] 
 PAHTAKOR Tashkent           6-0  Amur Blagoveshchensk 
   [Oleg Yeremeyev-2, Alexandr Korchonov, Viktor Churkin, Mikhail An pen, Tulyagan Isakov. Att: 25,000] 
 RostSelMash Rostov-na-Donu  0-1  FAKEL Voronezh 
   [Valeriy Abramov 3. Att: 15,000] 
 Rubin Kazan                 0-2  SPARTAK Moskva        [in Sochi] 
   [Mikhail Bulgakov 18 pen, Vadim Pavlenko 22. Att: 4,000] 
 SKA Kiev                    2-0  Neftyanik Fergana 
   [Alexandr Dovbiy, Nikolai Pinchuk. Att: 9,000] 
 SPARTAK Ivano-Frankovsk     2-1  Kolhozchi Ashkhabad   [aet] 
   [Alexandr Martynenko ?, 102 – Sergei Fomin 75. Att: 10,000] 
 Spartak Orjonikidze         1-1  DINAMO Minsk          [pen 4-5] 
   [Georgiy Kaishauri 115 – Yuriy Kurnenin 119. Att: 12,000] 
 TEREK Grozny                3-2  Zvezda Perm           [aet] 
   [Vitaliy Yakushkin-2, Anzor Chikhladze – Anatoliy Malyarov, Sergei Grigorovich. Att: 5,000] 
 Torpedo Kutaisi             0-1  METALLIST Kharkov 
   [Stanislav Bernikov 36. Att: 15,000] 
 UralMash Sverdlovsk         0-2  SKA Rostov-na-Donu    [in Fergana] 
   [Wilhelm Tellinger 12, Viktor Bondarenko 60 pen. Att: 2,000] 
 YANGIYER                    1-1  Tavria Simferopol     [pen 6-5] 
   [I.Budantsev 120 – Valentin Prilepskiy 105. Att: 12,000]

Second round
 [Apr 10] 
 DINAMO Minsk                5-0  Neftchi Baku 
   [Yuriy Kurnenin 6, Alexandr Prokopenko 41, Anatoliy Bogovik 43, Anatoliy Baidachny 45, Pyotr Vasilevskiy 89. Att: 30,000] 
 Fakel Voronezh              2-3  KAYRAT Alma-Ata 
   [Givi Anfimiadi 33, Vladimir Proskurin 47 – Viktor Zarechny 48, Sergei Lukashov 49, Sultan Abenov 75. Att: 35,000] 
 Guria Lanckhuti             0-1  CSKA Moskva 
   [Yuriy Panteleyev 88. Att: 16,000] 
 ISKRA Smolensk              3-1  Krylya Sovetov Kuibyshev 
   [Jemal Silagadze 5, Yuriy Kolesnikov 64, Viktor Davydov 68 – Viktor Kapayev 67. Att: 15,000] 
 Metallist Kharkov           2-2  KARPATY Lvov          [pen 2-4] 
   [Roman Davyd 22, 34 – Vladimir Danilyuk 62, Fyodor Chorba 75 pen. Att: 40,000] 
 Metallurg Zapoorozhye       0-1  ZENIT Leningrad 
   [Alexandr Markin 42. Att: 22,000] 
 Nistru Kishinev             0-1  SHAKHTYOR Donetsk     [aet] 
   [Yuriy Dudinskiy 96. Att: 20,000] 
 PAHTAKOR Tashkent           1-0  Dinamo Tbilisi 
   [Mikhail An 79 pen. Att: 25,000] 
 Pamir Dushanbe              0-1  TORPEDO Moskva        [aet] 
   [Vladimir Sakharov 103. Att: 22,000] 
 SKA Khabarovsk              0-2  DINAMO Kiev           [in Sochi] 
   [Sergei Kuznetsov 74, Oleg Blokhin 87. Att: 4,000] 
 SKA Kiev                    2-0  Chernomorets Odessa 
   [Nikolai Pinchuk 16, Alexandr Dovbiy 29. Att: 11,000] 
 SKA Rostov-na-Donu          0-2  ZARYA Voroshilovgrad 
   [Yuriy Rabochiy 74, Anatoliy Kuksov 88. Att: 20,000] 
 SPARTAK Ivano-Frankovsk     1-1  Ararat Yerevan        [pen 5-4] 
   [Alexandr Martynenko 56 - Andranik Khachatryan 20. Att: 20,000] 
 SPARTAK Moskva              3-1  Lokomotiv Moskva      [in Sochi] 
   [Georgiy Yartsev 28, Mikhail Bulgakov 44, 72 pen – Alexei Ovchinnikov 44 pen. Att: 4,000] 
 Terek Grozny                1-2  DNEPR Dnepropetrovsk 
   [Anatoliy Sinko 76 – Nikolai Samoilenko 35, Anatoliy Shelest 50. Att: 17,000] 
 Yangiyer                    0-1  DINAMO Moskva 
   [Mikhail Gershkovich 25. Att: 13,000]

Third round
 [Jun 17] 
 CSKA Moskva                 1-2  SKA Kiev 
   [Boris Kopeikin 36 – Alexandr Dovbiy 18, Nikolai Pinchuk 38 pen. Att: 15,000] 
 Iskra Smolensk              1-2  PAHTAKOR Tashkent 
   [Jemal Silagadze 48 – Yuriy Basov 56, Mikhail An 80. Att: 15,000] 
 [Jun 18] 
 DINAMO Kiev                 2-0  Spartak Ivano-Frankovsk 
   [Alexandr Berezhnoi 61, Oleg Blokhin 69. Att: 8,000] 
 Dnepr Dnepropetrovsk        1-3  ZARYA Voroshilovgrad 
   [Vladimir Kutsev 56 - Alexandr Ignatenko 45, Sergei Andreyev 62, Vyacheslav Semyonov 67. Att: 12,000] 
 Kayrat Alma-Ata             0-2  DINAMO Moskva 
   [Andrei Yakubik 11, Alexandr Maksimenkov 58. Att: 15,000] 
 SHAKHTYOR Donetsk           1-0  Dinamo Minsk 
   [Vladimir Safonov 30. Att: 20,000] 
 TORPEDO Moskva              0-0  Spartak Moskva        [pen 3-1] 
   [Att: 45,000] 
 ZENIT Leningrad             2-0  Karpaty Lvov 
   [Vyacheslav Melnikov 53, 73. Att: 15,000]

Quarterfinals
 [Jul 9] 
 TORPEDO Moskva          1-0  SKA Kiev 
   [Vladimir Sakharov 58 pen. Att: 18,000] 
 [Jul 10] 
 DINAMO Moskva           3-0  Dinamo Kiev 
   [Oleg Dolmatov 48, Vladimir Kazachonok 55, 74. Att: 35,000] 
 ZARYA Voroshilovgrad    1-0  Pahtakor Tashkent 
   [Anatoliy Kuksov 77. Att: 13,000] 
 ZENIT Leningrad         1-1  Shakhtyor Donetsk     [pen 4-3] 
   [Vladimir Klementyev 79 – Vitaliy Starukhin 57. Att: 45,000]

Semifinals
 [Jul 31] 
 Zarya Voroshilovgrad    0-1  TORPEDO Moskva 
   [Yevgeniy Khrabrostin 79. Att: 27,000] 
 [Aug 1] 
 DINAMO Moskva           2-1  Zenit Leningrad 
   [Alexandr Minayev 49, Alexandr Makhovikov 71 – Alexandr Markin 81. Att: 35,000]

Final

External links
 Complete calendar. helmsoccer.narod.ru
 1977 Soviet Cup. Footballfacts.ru
 1977 Soviet football season. RSSSF

Soviet Cup seasons
Cup
Soviet Cup
Soviet Cup